No. 14 (Advanced) Flying Training School (14 (A)FTS) is a former Royal Air Force flying training school that operated between 1939 and 1953.

References

Citations

Bibliography

External links

Military units and formations established in 1939
14